Walkerton Tavern was built in 1825.  It was listed on the National Register of Historic Places in 1984.  In 1984 the listing included five contributing buildings and one contributing site.

The tavern is owned by the government of Henrico County, Virginia and is used as a community center.  It is also available for rental.

References

External links
 Walkerton Tavern

Commercial buildings on the National Register of Historic Places in Virginia
Commercial buildings completed in 1825
Buildings and structures in Henrico County, Virginia
Tourist attractions in Henrico County, Virginia
National Register of Historic Places in Henrico County, Virginia